The Marion County Housing Committee Demonstration House in Salem, Oregon is a small house from c. 1860 that was renovated extensively in 1934–35.  It has also been known as the William Beckett House, named for the person believed to be the original owner in the 1860s.  It was listed on the National Register of Historic Places in 1988.  It is a work of architects Clarence L. Smith and Frank S. Strubble.

References

Houses on the National Register of Historic Places in Salem, Oregon
Colonial Revival architecture in Oregon
Houses completed in 1935
1935 establishments in Oregon